Nemastylis nuttallii, the Nuttall's pleatleaf, Ozark celestial-lily or pine woods lily, is a plant species native to  Arkansas, Missouri and Oklahoma in the south-central United States. Some authors have mistakenly called this species N. coelestina.

Nemastylis nuttallii is a bulb-forming perennial herb up to 40 cm (3 feet) tall. Stems are usually unbranched. Leaves are very narrow and linear. Flowers are pale blue, opening in the evening.

References

Iridaceae
Flora of Oklahoma
Flora of Arkansas
Flora of Missouri
Plants described in 1945
Flora without expected TNC conservation status